Kwigillingok is a census-designated place (CDP) in Bethel Census Area, Alaska,  United States.  The population was 321 at the 2010 census, down from 338 in 2000.

Geography

Demographics

Kwigillingok first appeared on the 1920 U.S. Census as Quigillingok, an unincorporated native village. It did not appear on the 1930 census, but was returned as "Quigilinook" in 1940. In 1950, the name was changed to the present spelling of Kwigillingok. It was made a census-designated place in 1980.

As of the census of 2000, there were 388 people, 96 households, and 89 families residing in the CDP.  The population density was 16.8 people per square mile (6.5/km2).  There were 78 housing units at an average density of 3.9/sq mi (1.5/km2).  The racial makeup of the CDP was 2.07% White, 97.63% Native American, and 0.30% from two or more races.

There were 96 households, out of which 60.3% had children under the age of 18 living with them, 74.0% were married couples living together, 8.2% had a female householder with no husband present, and 9.6% were non-families. 6.8% of all households were made up of individuals, and none had someone living alone who was 65 years of age or older.  The average household size was 4.63 and the average family size was 4.89.

In the CDP, the population was spread out, with 39.9% under the age of 18, 8.9% from 18 to 24, 29.9% from 25 to 44, 14.2% from 45 to 64, and 7.1% who were 65 years of age or older.  The median age was 26 years. For every 100 females, there were 131.5 males.  For every 100 females age 18 and over, there were 128.1 males.

The median income for a household in the CDP was $36,250, and the median income for a family was $33,250. Males had a median income of $23,125 versus $50,625 for females. The per capita income for the CDP was $7,577.  About 28.8% of families and 34.7% of the population were below the poverty line, including 46.8% of those under age 18 and none of those age 65 or over.

Transportation
The Kwigillingok Airport is the only connection to the outside world, as there are no roads leading to the town.

Education
It is served by the K-12 Kwigillingok School, operated by the Lower Kuskokwim School District.  it has about 144 students.

References

Census-designated places in Alaska
Census-designated places in Bethel Census Area, Alaska
Census-designated places in Unorganized Borough, Alaska
Populated coastal places in Alaska on the Pacific Ocean